Midaq Alley is a 1947 novel by Egyptian author Naguib Mahfouz, first published in English in 1966. The story is about Midaq Alley in Khan el-Khalili, a teeming back street in Cairo which is presented as a microcosm of the world.

Plot introduction
Mahfouz plays on the cultural setting. The novel is introduced with description of the Arab culture. It centers around the list of characters described below.  The novel takes place in the 1940s and represents standing on the threshold of a modern era in Cairo and the rest of the nation as a whole.

Characters
Each character is expressed like a caricature in which one quality or trait is over-emphasized. Mahfouz is not satirizing the individual character – he is satirizing the character type.

 Kirsha, a café owner who illegally sells and uses hashish and has a predilection for young boys
 Mrs. Kirsha, infamous for her temper
 Uncle Kamil, good-hearted, bachelor sweets-seller, famously bloated and sleepy
 Abbas, a young, kindly barber who wants to get married, joins the British army to make money to be able to marry Hamida. 
 Salim Alwan, the lustful, wealthy businessman who competes with Abbas for the love of Hamida. After surviving a heart attack, he becomes embittered, preventing him from marrying Hamida
 Dr. Booshy, the self-proclaimed dentist who sells false teeth at dirt-cheap prices by stealing them off dead bodies
 Sanker, the waiter at Kirsha's café
 Sheikh Darwish, the old poet and former English teacher, who left his former life to roam the streets.
 Radwan Hussainy, a landlord who beats his wife and failed his al-Azhar exams, yet is revered for his high degree of education and devotion to God. He has lost all of his children.
 Hussain Kirsha, son of the café owner who works for the British. He marries a woman of lower class and returns home with her and her brother.
 Saniya Afify, widowed landlady who desires to remarry. Umm Hamida sets her up with a younger man named Ahmed Effendi Talbat
 Umm Hamida, the neighborhood matchmaker and bath attendant; Hamida's foster mother
 Hamida, a beautiful young woman who dreams of a better life and has a distinctly self-centered personality, but is easily persuaded by wealth or power.
 Husniya, the bakeress who beats her husband with her slipper
 Jaada, Husniya's husband
 Zaita, the cripple maker who lives outside the bakery and aids Dr. Booshy in his theft of false teeth.
 Ibrahim Farhat, a politician
 Ibrahim Faraj, a pimp who tries to seduce Hamida into working for him
 The Poet, who is replaced by a radio and is barred by Kirsha (only appears in the first chapter)

See also 
 Naguib Mahfouz
 El callejón de los milagros (a 1995 Mexican film based on the novel)
 Nobel Prize in Literature

References

External links
 A Book Review by Louis Proyect
 'Aqoul Reviews
 Washington Report on Middle East Affairs Review
 

Novels by Naguib Mahfouz
1947 novels
Arabic-language novels
Novels set in Cairo